Falmouth Lifeboat Station is the base for Royal National Lifeboat Institution (RNLI) search and rescue operations at Falmouth, Cornwall in the United Kingdom. The first lifeboat was stationed in the town in 1867 and the present station was opened in 1993. It operates a Severn Class all-weather Lifeboat (ALB) and an Atlantic 85 inshore lifeboat (ILB).

History
Falmouth is situated on the Carrick Roads, a large natural harbour on the south coast of Cornwall. It developed as a port for packet boats in the seventeenth century. These moved elsewhere in the 1850s but a new commercial dockyard was founded in 1860. A committee was set up in 1865 to request the RNLI to station a lifeboat at Falmouth. A wooden lifeboat house was sanctioned and constructed near the recently constructed docks, being opened on 28 August 1867. The building cost £158 and a 10-oared lifeboat was built in London at a cost of £280. This was paid for by money raised in Gloucester and the boat had been named City of Gloucester in that city on 9 April that year. Another £98 10s paid for a carriage that enabled the boat to be transported to the best launch site for any particular rescue. In 1901 the local secretary informed the crew that their services would no longer be required after 20 April; there was concern about their conduct at launchings. In 1918 the RNLI's lease on the land at the docks was terminated and the lifeboat was moved to moorings in the main harbour. A boarding boat was provided to enable the crew to reach their boat.

The first motor lifeboat at Falmouth was Watson Class The Brothers, originally stationed at Penlee Lifeboat Station, it was transferred to Falmouth on 14 April 1931. It was powered by a Weyburn 80BHP petrol engine. The replacement Watson-class boat, B.A.S.P. (the initials of the donors, Blackburn, Armstrong, Smart and Price) which arrived in 1934, had been the first lifeboat at Yarmouth on the Isle of Wight and the second of three Watson-class built by J Samuel White of Cowes to be stationed at Falmouth, is now preserved in the RNLI historic lifeboat collection at the Dockyard, Chatham. The third Watson was Crawford and Constance Conybeare in 1940.

The station’s last displacement hulled lifeboat, the prototype Thames class lifeboat Rotary Service, left the station in August 1976 after four years' service. It was replaced by the prototype Waveney, 44-001. It operated from Falmouth until June the following year. Unofficially called 'The Yank' after its American connection, 44-001 is now also preserved in the RNLI historic lifeboat collection at the Dockyard, Chatham.

An experimental  Hatch Type rigid inshore rescue boat (IRB), 18-01, was temporarily stationed at Falmouth from August to October 1967. Another early rigid ILB, an  McLachlan, was used at Falmouth as the station's boarding boat. It proved useful for some inshore rescues, so was formally designated an ILB from 27 March 1980. It was replaced by a more conventional Atlantic 21 rigid-hulled inflatable boat (RIB) in 1987.

Work on a new lifeboat station to house the inshore lifeboat started near the docks in July 1993; six months later it was brought into use and the hut on North Quay was vacated. The boat was kept inside, and was launched from a carriage using a specially constructed slipway. Two years later, a mooring was dredged close by to allow the all-weather boat to be moored alongside.

On station in 1997 was The Will, the first production Severn Class. It had been built in 1995 for Stornoway Lifeboat Station but had to undergo several modifications before it was fit for service. In the meantime it had been shown to many lifeboat stations where the class was expected to be deployed. It so impressed the crew at Falmouth that they asked the RNLI to station it there until their own boat was built, and so it was there from January 1997 until December 2001.

Queen Elizabeth II, Patron of the RNLI, visited the station on 1 May 2002 to name the station's latest lifeboat Richard Scott Cox.

Service awards
The volunteer crews of the RNLI do not expect reward or recognition for their work, but the records include many rescues that have been recognised by letters, certificates and medals from the RNLI management. This list is just some of the most notable.

On 19 January 1940, the lifeboat Crawford and Constance Conybeare put to sea, just six days after being christened. The SS Kirkpool of West Hartlepool was dragging its anchors in a gale. The lifeboat managed to pass a line between the ship and a tug but this was not able to prevent it running aground, which caused a serious injury to a seaman in the engine room. He and 13 colleagues were taken off by the lifeboat and landed in Falmouth. The lifeboat then returned to the grounded ship and managed to rescue the remaining 21 crew members. Lifeboat Coxswain John Snell was awarded a Silver Medal for his outstanding seamanship and great courage, and his Motor Mechanic, Charles Williams, received a Bronze Medal too for his gallantry.

The relief lifeboat Princess Royal (C.S. No. 7) was called out twice on the evening of 7 August 1972. It returned to its moorings at a quarter past midnight. Four hours later it was called out again to a small boat carrying ten people that had a damaged rudder and was at the mercy of a Force 9 severe gale. The lifeboat stood by waiting for a tug to arrive, but the boat lost its anchor so more positive action was needed. Despite the  waves the lifeboat managed to take off eight people, leaving just two on board to crew the boat. The tug eventually arrived and took the boat in tow into Falmouth; the lifeboat returned to its moorings at half past three in the afternoon. Lifeboat Coxswain Walter Brown was awarded a Bronze Medal for his skill and courage, and the efforts of his crew were also recognised.

Five men managed to jump onto the lifeboat, but the sixth narrowly missed being crushed between the lifeboat and the rolling barge. Lifeboat Coxswain Arthur West was awarded a Bronze Medal for his outstanding seamanship and tremendous courage, and his crew were also recognised for the parts they played in the rescue.

An unexpected storm, gusting up to hurricane force 12, blew up in the Western Approaches on 13 August 1979 during the Fastnet Race while 303 yachts were at sea. The recently arrived Arun class lifeboat, which was later to be named Elizabeth Ann, put to sea on one fruitless search on the evening of 13 August. Soon after returning to its station it was asked to join lifeboats from 12 other stations in a major operation to rescue crews. It took up a search area to the west of the Isles of Scilly eight hours after leaving its moorings. After 32 hours the crew were given a break at Newlyn. It finally returned home just after midnight, in the early hours of 16 August. In common with the other stations involved, Falmouth received a special framed certificate from Duke of Atholl, the chairman of the RNLI. Among the yachts assisted was the Drum which capsized when it lost its keel. With the help of a helicopter, all 22 crew members, including pop star Simon Le Bon, were rescued safely.

Description
The lifeboat station is situated in Tinners Walk close to Falmouth Docks. The building is shared with H.M. Coastguard and separate areas provide covered storage for the coastguard equipment and the RNLI inshore lifeboat. The building also houses an RNLI fund-raising shop. A slipway in front of the building is used for launching the ILB, while the all-weather boat is moored at a pontoon alongside.

Area of operation
Adjacent lifeboats are at Fowey Lifeboat Station to the East, and The Lizard Lifeboat Station to the West.

Current fleet

 17-29 Richard Cox Scott – a   AWB entered service at Falmouth on 18 May 2001. This is moored at a pontoon in front of the lifeboat station. It carries a  inflatable boat (number Y193) that can be deployed while at sea.
 B-916 Robina Nixon Chard – an  Class ILB entered service at Falmouth on 21 August 2019

Former lifeboats
'ON' is the RNLI's sequential Official Number; 'Op. No.' is the operational number painted onto the boat.

Pulling and sailing lifeboats

Motor lifeboats

Inshore lifeboats

See also

 List of RNLI stations

References

External links

 Official station website
 RNLI station information

Lifeboat stations in Cornwall
Buildings and structures in Falmouth, Cornwall